Prejudice (Préjudice) is a 2015 drama film directed by Antoine Cuypers and co-written by Cuypers with Antoine Wauters. The film is an international co-production between Belgium, Luxembourg and the Netherlands. It opened the 30th Festival International du Film Francophone de Namur on 2 October 2015.

Cast 
 Nathalie Baye as Mother
 Arno Hintjens as Alain 
 Thomas Blanchard as Cédric 
 Ariane Labed as Caroline 
 Éric Caravaca as Gaetan 
 Cathy Min Jung as Cyrielle 
 Julien Baumgartner as Laurent 
 Arthur Bols as Nathan

Accolades

References

External links 
 

2015 films
2015 drama films
2010s French-language films
Belgian drama films
Luxembourgian drama films
Dutch drama films
2015 directorial debut films
French-language Belgian films